Aurélie Chaboudez (born 9 May 1993) is a French athlete specialising in the 400 metres hurdles. She represented her country at the 2015 World Championships in Beijing, reaching the semifinals.  She was the first French athlete to attain this level of competition. Her personal best in the event is 55.51 set in Marseille in 2015.

International competitions

Personal Bests

References

External links

 

1993 births
Living people
French female hurdlers
World Athletics Championships athletes for France
Sportspeople from Montbéliard
Athletes (track and field) at the 2010 Summer Youth Olympics
Mediterranean Games bronze medalists for France
Athletes (track and field) at the 2018 Mediterranean Games
Mediterranean Games medalists in athletics
French Athletics Championships winners
Youth Olympic gold medalists for France
Youth Olympic gold medalists in athletics (track and field)